Julian Rashad Johnson (born January 2, 1986) is a former American football safety. He was drafted by the Arizona Cardinals in the third round of the 2009 NFL Draft.  He played college football at Alabama.

Early years
A native of Sulligent, Alabama, about four miles from the Mississippi state line. The son of Randy and Gloria Johnson attended Sulligent High School and starred in football, basketball and track for the Blue Devils. He graduated ranked fifth in a senior class of only 54 students.

College career
Johnson had no Division I-A college scholarship offers—the largest schools to offer him scholarships were The Citadel and North Alabama. He made an unofficial visit to Alabama, and chose to attend Alabama as a walk-on running back. He redshirted in his first year of eligibility, and as a freshman appeared in all 12 games on special teams.

In spring practice of his sophomore season, he was told by coaches that he'd never be a starting running back there, but they wanted him to switch to defense and play safety. That season (2006), he played in 11 games (missing two due to an ankle injury), starting four at free safety, and earned a full scholarship. He totaled 33 tackles and two forced fumbles. In his junior year in 2007, the now-team captain started all 13 games and led the Tide with 81 tackles and six interceptions. He earned Alabama Co-Defensive Player of the Year honors, was a first-team coaches' All-SEC selection, and earned shared UA's 2008 Mal Moore Leadership Award (with center Antoine Caldwell) for his performance during spring practice.

In the 2008 game versus LSU, Johnson had three interceptions (tying an Alabama single-game record), including one that he returned for a touchdown, and one in overtime that helped Alabama win the game and secure the SEC West Division crown. For the season, Johnson was second on the team with 89 tackles and had five interceptions. He was named unanimous first-team All-SEC and earned first-team All-American honors.

He graduated with a degree in criminal justice.

Professional career

Arizona Cardinals
Johnson was selected by the Arizona Cardinals in the third round (95th overall) of the 2009 NFL Draft. As a rookie in 2009, he played in 10 games. In 2010, he played all 16 games with one start with season totals of 43 tackles and his first career interception. In 2011, he played in 16 games, starting nine of them and totaling 50 tackles.

He became a restricted free agent following the 2010 season, but was re-signed on April 26, 2011. He played in 18 games, starting three, with 20 tackles and two interceptions, one of which was his first touchdown after intercepting Detroit Lions quarterback Matthew Stafford.

On March 12, 2013, Johnson signed a three-year contract to stay with the Cardinals. Before the start of the 2013 season, he switched to jersey number 26 from his original number 49. During a game against the New Orleans Saints on September 22, 2013, he lost his left middle fingertip. He had his first multi-interception game against the Atlanta Falcons, picking off two Matt Ryan passes. In 2013, he started seven of his 13 games and totaled career highs in tackles with 58 and interceptions with three.

A key special teams performer, through his first five-season he totaled 41 special teams tackles. In the 2012 season, he racked up 64 yards on two fake punts, picking up first downs after runs of 40 and 24 yards.

Tennessee Titans
On March 25, 2016, Johnson signed a one-year contract with the Tennessee Titans. Johnson spent one season with the Titans, collecting 38 tackles and one forced fumble.

Retirement
On January 3, 2018, Johnson announced his retirement from the NFL.

Career NFL statistics

Post-retirement career
In 2018, Johnson joined the University of Alabama as the sideline reporter for Alabama's gameday radio team and as member of the Alabama football staff in an off-field role.

References

External links
Arizona Cardinals bio
Alabama Crimson Tide bio

1986 births
Living people
People from Sulligent, Alabama
Players of American football from Alabama
African-American players of American football
American football safeties
Alabama Crimson Tide football players
Arizona Cardinals players
Tennessee Titans players
21st-century African-American sportspeople
20th-century African-American people
Ed Block Courage Award recipients